Andreas Andrish Neofytou (born 7 July 1998) is a Cypriot professional footballer who plays for Cypriot First Division club PAEEK on loan from Anorthosis Famagusta. He plays as a defensive midfielder.

Club career 
On 23 June 2020, the 21-year-old Neofytou signed a four-year contract with Cypriot club Anorthosis Famagusta and will remain in Karmiotissa until the end of the 2020–21 season.

References

External links 

1998 births
Living people
Cypriot footballers
Cyprus youth international footballers
Anorthosis Famagusta F.C. players
Association football midfielders
Sportspeople from Limassol